The fourth season of the High School DxD anime television series, titled High School DxD Hero, aired from April 10 to July 3, 2018 on TV Tokyo's satellite channel AT-X adapts material from the ninth and tenth volumes of the light novel and is produced by Passione, directed by Yoshifumi Sueda, and written by Kenji Konuta. During production of this season Ishibumi had the Passione staff read nearly all of the light novels so that they don't miss any inaccuracies and warned them off taking any creative liberties with the material like TNK had. The opening theme for this season is titled "SWITCH" by Minami and the ending theme is titled "Motenai Kuse ni" by Tapimiru



Episode list

References

External links
  
 

2018 Japanese television seasons
High School DxD episode lists